is a metro station on the Sendai Subway Nanboku Line in Izumi-ku, Sendai, Miyagi Prefecture, Japan.

Lines

Station layout
Yaotome Station is an elevated station with a single island platform serving two tracks on the third floor of the station building, with a concourse and ticketing facilities and wicket gates underneath.

Platforms

History
Yaotomo Station was opened on 15 July 1987. Operations were temporarily halted from 11 March to 29 April 2011 due to the effects of the 2011 Tōhoku earthquake and tsunami.

Passenger statistics
In fiscal 2015, the station was used by an average of 7,857 passengers daily.

Surrounding area
Izumi-Yaotome Post Office

References

External links

 

Railway stations in Sendai
Sendai Subway Namboku Line
Railway stations in Japan opened in 1987